The following are international rankings of China.

Agriculture

Communications and Technology

Consumption

Demographics

Economics

Energy and Environment

Geography

Globalization

Industry

Military

Politics

Society

Sports

Transport

References

External links
PRC Government Statistics Department

China